The following were mayors of Shaftesbury, Dorset, England:

1331-2 and 1351-2: John Haselmere
1355: Robert Fovent
Michaelmas 1374–5, 1379-80: Edward Leante.
Michaelmas 1383-4: Richard Payn
Michaelmas 1390-2 and 1400-1: Thomas Cammell
Michaelmas 1392–3, 1401–2, 1404-6: Walter Biere
Michaelmas 1402-3 and 1415-16: Hugh Croxhale
1403-4: Thomas Hat
1409-10: Thomas Hat
1414-1415: Thomas Haselmere
1545-1546: John Garputs

References

Shaftesbury